Francis Powell may refer to:

 Francis Powell (priest) (1905–1998), Dean of Belize
 Sir Francis Powell, 1st Baronet (1827–1911), English politician
 Franny Powell (born 1977), English footballer

See also 
 Frank Powell (disambiguation)